Afrocanthium shabanii is a species of flowering plant in the family Rubiaceae. It is endemic to Tanzania.

References

External links
World Checklist of Rubiaceae

Vanguerieae
Endemic flora of Tanzania
Vulnerable flora of Africa
Taxonomy articles created by Polbot
Taxa named by Diane Mary Bridson